Jharkhand People's Party, is a political party in India. It was launched by the radical All Jharkhand Students Union (AJSU) on 30 Dec 1991, at a conference in Ranchi under the leadership of led by Dr. Ram Dayal Munda. AJSU was founded on 22 June 1986. JPP was reconstituted in 1994, with Dr. Ram Dayal Munda as president and Surya Singh Besra as general secretary.

Later a split occurred JPP and  the faction led by Surya Singh Besra retained the name Jharkhand People's Party. The faction led by Sudesh Mahto started using the name of parent organization - All Jharkhand Students Union.

References

Political parties in Jharkhand
Political parties established in 1991
1991 establishments in Bihar